Tonini is an Italian surname. Notable people with the surname include:

Alessandro Tonini (1885–1932), Italian aeronautical engineer and aircraft designer and manufacturer
Alice Tonini, Italian chess player
Angelo Tonini (1888–1974), Italian long jumper and high jumper
Ersilio Tonini (1914–2013), Italian Roman Catholic archbishop and cardinal
Giorgio Tonini (born 1959), Italian journalist and politician

See also

Surnames
Italian-language surnames
Patronymic surnames
Surnames of Italian origin